A special election was held on June 6, 2017, to elect the member of the United States House of Representatives for California's 34th congressional district. A special open primary election was held on April 4, 2017.

Incumbent Representative Xavier Becerra, nominated by Governor Jerry Brown to succeed Kamala Harris, was confirmed as Attorney General of California on January 23, 2017. Harris, who was elected to the United States Senate to succeed Barbara Boxer, resigned as attorney general on January 3, 2017.

Democrats Jimmy Gomez and Robert Lee Ahn advanced to the runoff. Gomez defeated Ahn 59.22% to 40.78%.

Candidates

Democratic Party
Upon the announcement of incumbent Representative Xavier Becerra's selection as Attorney General of California, John Pérez, the former Speaker of the California State Assembly, announced his candidacy to succeed him in the House of Representatives. He soon withdrew from the race, citing a recent health diagnosis.

Declared
 Robert Lee Ahn, attorney and Los Angeles City planning commissioner
 Vanessa Aramayo, former congressional aide and former California Assembly aide
 Maria Cabildo, former Los Angeles City planning commissioner and director of homeless initiatives at the LA County Community Development Commission & Housing Authority, Co-Founder of East LA Community Corporation
 Alejandra Campoverdi, former White House aide for U.S. President Barack Obama
 Arturo Carmona, former Bernie Sanders presidential campaign staff member
 Wendy Carrillo, labor activist and radio host
 Ricardo De La Fuente, businessman and son of 2016 presidential candidate Rocky De La Fuente
 Yolie Flores, former Los Angeles Unified School District board member
 Melissa "Sharkie" Garza, filmmaker and businesswoman
 Jimmy Gomez, state assemblyman
 Sara Hernandez, former public school teacher, attorney, nonprofit founder, and former district director and special counsel to LA City Council Member Jose Huizar.
 Steven Mac, Los Angeles County Deputy District Attorney
 Sandra Mendoza, candidate for the State Assembly in 2014 and 2016
 Raymond Meza, SEIU labor organizer
 Armando Sotomayor, activist
 Richard Joseph Sullivan, attorney
 Tracy Van Houten, aerospace engineer
 Tenaya Wallace, public relations strategist

Withdrew
 John Pérez, former Speaker of the California State Assembly
 Dr. Jason Ahn, Physician at UCLA

Declined
 Gil Cedillo, Los Angeles City Councilman
 Kevin de León, State Senator and President pro tempore of the California State Senate
 Monica Garcia, Los Angeles School Board member
 José Huizar, Los Angeles City Councilman
 Jesse Leon, aide to Los Angeles City Councilman José Huizar
 Holly Mitchell, state senator
 Nick Pacheco, former Los Angeles City Councilman and candidate for Los Angeles County District Attorney in 2004
 David Ryu, Los Angeles City Councilman
 Miguel Santiago, state assemblyman

Republican Party

Declared
 William Rodriguez Morrison, apartment building manager and perennial candidate

Green Party

Declared
 Kenneth Mejia, certified public accountant and candidate for this seat in 2016

Libertarian Party

Declared
 Angela McArdle, litigation paralegal and legal aide

Independents

Declared
 Mark Padilla, law office administrator

General election

Endorsements

Polling

Results

Runoff

Endorsements

Results

See also
List of special elections to the United States House of Representatives
2016 United States House of Representatives elections in California
2017 United States House of Representatives elections

References

California 2017 34
California 2017 34
2017 34 Special
California 34 Special
United States House of Representatives 34 Special
United States House of Representatives 2017 34